William Bernard Haeffner (July 18, 1894 – January 27, 1982) was an American Major League Baseball catcher. He played for the Philadelphia Athletics during the  season, the Pittsburgh Pirates during the  season, and the New York Giants during the  season.  Haeffner served as the head baseball coach as La Salle University from 1947 to 1952.

He died on January 27, 1982, and is interred at Mount Peace Cemetery in Philadelphia, Pennsylvania.

References

External links

1894 births
1982 deaths
Burials at Mount Peace Cemetery
Major League Baseball catchers
New York Giants players
Philadelphia Athletics players
Pittsburgh Pirates players
Hamilton Hams players
La Salle Explorers baseball coaches
Baseball players from Philadelphia